2,2,2-Trichloroethanol is the chemical compound with formula .  Its molecule can be described as that of ethanol, with the three hydrogen atoms at position 2 (the methyl group) replaced by chlorine atoms. It is a clear flammable liquid at room temperature, colorless when pure but often with a light yellow color.

The pharmacological effects of this compound in humans are similar to those of its prodrug chloral hydrate, and of chlorobutanol. Historically, it has been used as a sedative hypnotic. The hypnotic drug triclofos (2,2,2-trichloroethyl phosphate) is metabolized in vivo to 2,2,2-trichloroethanol. Chronic exposure may result in kidney and liver damage.

2,2,2-Trichloroethanol can be added to SDS-PAGE gels in order to enable fluorescent detection of proteins without a staining step, for immunoblotting or other analysis methods.

Use in organic synthesis 
2,2,2-Trichloroethanol is an effective protecting group for carboxylic acids due to its ease in addition and removal.

See also 
 1,1,1-Trichloroethane
 Tribromoethanol
 Triclofos

References 

Primary alcohols
Sedatives
GABAA receptor positive allosteric modulators
Glycine receptor agonists
NMDA receptor antagonists
Chloroethanols
Trichloromethyl compounds